Andrew Aitken (27 April 1877 – 15 February 1955) was a Scottish footballer who was one of the early game's most prominent players.

After playing for local Ayrshire sides, he signed for English Second Division club Newcastle United in 1895, then in only their third league season. He helped the club to promotion in 1898 and was a key member of the side as they established themselves in the First Division, captaining the Magpies from 1899 to 1905.

During his time at the club, Aitken – nicknamed 'Daddler' – helped them win their first League Championship in the 1904–05 season as well as appearing in two FA Cup Finals, both losses, in 1905 and 1906.

He left Newcastle United in November 1906 becoming player/manager at Middlesbrough, a role he also held at Leicester City (then known as Leicester Fosse) from 1909 until 1911.

He returned to Scotland to finish his playing career with Dundee and Kilmarnock, his career ending in January 1913 with a serious groin injury.

He was quickly appointed manager of Gateshead Town for a while before becoming a publican on Tyneside, where he resided until his death in 1955.

See also
List of Scotland national football team captains

References

External links

1877 births
1955 deaths
Footballers from Ayr
Dundee F.C. players
Kilmarnock F.C. players
Ayr Parkhouse F.C. players
Leicester City F.C. players
Middlesbrough F.C. players
Middlesbrough F.C. managers
Newcastle United F.C. players
Leicester City F.C. managers
Gateshead Town F.C. managers
Scotland international footballers
Scottish football managers
Scottish footballers
Scottish Football League players
Scottish Football League managers
English Football League managers
English Football League players
Association football wing halves
Association football player-managers
FA Cup Final players